Pausandra is a plant genus of the family Euphorbiaceae first described in 1870. It is native to Central America and South America.

species
 Pausandra fordii Secco - Amapá, French Guiana
 Pausandra hirsuta Lanj. - Peru (Amazonas, Loreto), Brazil (Amazonas, Acre), Bolivia (Pando), Colombia (Amazonas)
 Pausandra macropetala Ducke - Brazil (Amazonas, Pará), Peru (Loreto), Venezuela (Amazonas)
 Pausandra macrostachya Ducke - Pará
 Pausandra martini Baill. - French Guiana, Suriname, Guyana, Colombia, Venezuela, Peru, Brazil
 Pausandra megalophylla Müll.Arg. - Rio de Janeiro
 Pausandra morisiana (Casar.) Radlk. - Brazil
 Pausandra trianae (Müll.Arg.) Baill. - widespread from Honduras to Bolivia

formerly included
moved to Dodecastigma 
P. integrifolia - Dodecastigma integrifolium

References 

Euphorbiaceae genera
Codiaeae